Jenny is a novel by the Norwegian writer Sigrid Undset, published in 1911, and regarded as Undset's literary breakthrough. The novel is set in Rome and later in Norway. The protagonist "Jenny Winge" tries to make a career as a painter.

References

External links
  
 

1911 Norwegian novels
Novels by Sigrid Undset
Novels set in Norway
Novels set in Rome
20th-century Norwegian novels